Radan in Iran may refer to:
 Raddan, Isfahan Province
 Raran, Iran, Isfahan Province
 Radan, Sistan and Baluchestan